Inotilone is a chemical compound isolated from Phellinus linteus.

References

Phenols
Lactones